Tartu Parish is a rural municipality in Tartu County, Estonia. It has one borough (Raadi), six small boroughs (Äksi, Kõrveküla, Lähte, Tabivere, Vahi and Vasula) and 70 villages.

Since 2017, the parish mayor is Jarno Laur.

Settlements
Borough
Raadi

Small boroughs
Äksi - Kõrveküla - Lähte - Tabivere - Vahi - Vasula  

Villages
Aovere - Arupää - Elistvere - Erala - Haava - Igavere - Jõusa - Juula - Kaiavere - Kaitsemõisa - Kämara - Kärevere - Kärkna - Kärksi - Kassema - Kastli - Kikivere - Kobratu - Koogi - Kõnnujõe - Kõrenduse - Kükitaja - Kukulinna - Laeva - Lammiku - Lilu - Lombi - Maarja-Magdaleena - Maramaa - Metsanuka - Möllatsi - Nigula - Nõela - Otslava - Õvanurme - Õvi - Pataste - Piiri - Puhtaleiva - Pupastvere - Raigastvere - Reinu - Saadjärve - Saare - Salu - Sepa - Siniküla - Soeküla - Soitsjärve - Sojamaa - Sootaga - Taabri - Tammistu - Tila - Toolamaa - Tooni - Tormi - Uhmardu - Väägvere - Väänikvere - Valgma - Valmaotsa - Vedu - Vesneri - Viidike - Vilussaare - Võibla - Voldi

Religion

Geography
Lakes
Saadjärv
Soitsjärv

Gallery

See also
Kärkna Abbey
Ice Age Centre
Raadi Airfield

References

External links